Holoparamecus is a genus of handsome fungus beetles in the family Endomychidae. There are about 17 described species in Holoparamecus.

Species
These 17 species belong to the genus Holoparamecus:

 Holoparamecus amabilis Sasaji, 1991
 Holoparamecus atomus Ragusa, 1888
 Holoparamecus beloni Reitter, 1884
 Holoparamecus bertouti Aubé, 1861
 Holoparamecus caularum Aubé, 1843
 Holoparamecus constrictus Sharp, 1902
 Holoparamecus depressus Curtis, 1833
 Holoparamecus floridanus Fall, 1899
 Holoparamecus gabrielae Rücker, 2003
 Holoparamecus insularis Dajoz, 1972
 Holoparamecus kunzei Aubé, 1843
 Holoparamecus niger (Aubé, 1843)
 Holoparamecus pacificus LeConte, 1863
 Holoparamecus pumilus Sharp, 1902
 Holoparamecus punctatulus Reitter, 1908
 Holoparamecus ragusae Reitter, 1875
 Holoparamecus singularis Beck, 1917

References

Further reading

External links

 

Endomychidae
Articles created by Qbugbot
Coccinelloidea genera